The Cats of Mirikitani is a 2006 documentary film.

Synopsis
In 2001, Japanese American painter Jimmy Mirikitani (born Tsutomu Mirikitani), over 80 years old, was living on the streets of lower Manhattan. Filmmaker Linda Hattendorf took an interest, and began to engage with him to create a documentary of his life. After the destruction of the World Trade Center on September 11, 2001, the debris- and dust-choked streets were deserted. When Hattendorf "found" Mirikitani, in his usual spot along the wall of a Korean Market, near the intersection of MacDougal and Prince Street in Soho, she offered him shelter in her small apartment. During this period a beautiful and curious friendship flowered, as Ms. Hattendorf began the long process of re-integrating Mr. Mirikitani into society, recovering, among other documents, his social security card and passport. Over the months they lived together, she uncovered his true identity and history. And ultimately, she reunited him with his distant cousin, poet Janice Mirikitani, and his surviving sister, and helped him find his own apartment in an assisted living facility.

Over the course of the film, audiences learn about Mirikitani's past, including the injustice experienced by American-born Japanese during the Second World War, his career as an artist, his life among other artists, including Jackson Pollock. Ms. Hattendorf documents Mirikitani's epic journey, from California, to Hiroshima, back to California, to his imprisonment in an internment camp, to his sojourn across the country to Long Island and finally to New York City, where he was employed as a cook. When his employer died, Mirikitani became homeless, spending almost a decade in Washington Square Park. Later, he moved to the streets of Soho, where he created an atelier on the streets, and worked days and nights on his artwork.

Hattendorf's highly personal film about justice deferred, loss, and redemption has won many awards in the United States and abroad, and in the end brought both Hattendorf and Mirikitani well-deserved and hard-won regard. (The "cats" in the title are featured in Mirikitani's artwork.)

In May 2007 The Cats of Mirikitani aired on the PBS series Independent Lens.

Mirikitani died October 21, 2012, at the age of 92. Director Linda Hattendorf and her collaborator, Masa Yoshikawa, were at Mirikitani's deathbed.

Awards
Won the Audience Award at the 2006 Tribeca Film Festival.
Won the Best Picture Award in the Japanese Eyes section of the 2006 Tokyo International Film Festival
Won the audience award at the 2007 Lyon Film festival (Lyfe / Hors-Ecran)

References

External links

THE CATS OF MIRIKITANI  site for Independent Lens on PBS
Linda Hattendorf interview
 
18th Peace Art Exhibition: "The Cats of Mirikitani－ The Unconquerable Spirit of a New York Street Artist"　HATSUKAICHI ART GALLERY/HIROSHIMA　2014.8.1-8.31

2006 films
2006 documentary films
American documentary films
Films about Japanese Americans
Documentary films about the internment of Japanese Americans
Documentary films about the September 11 attacks
Documentary films about painters
Films set in Manhattan
2000s American films